A Wrong Way to Love is a 1969 Italian drama film. It was directed by Fernando Di Leo. It stars Nieves Navarro, Gianni Macchia, Micaela Pignatelli, Lucio Dalla, and Lea Lander.

Production
The female lead actress initially chosen was Lucia Bosè, later replaced by Pier Angeli and ultimately by Nieves Navarro. The singer-songwriter Lucio Dalla was given a comical sidekick role. The male protagonist's surname, Tessari, is a Di Leo's homage to his real life friend Duccio Tessari. The best known actor in the cast, Gary Merrill, has only a supporting role. The film has cameos of Giancarlo Cobelli and Maria Monti, as two small-theater performers. The director Di Leo appears uncredited as a client in a brothel.

Reception
The film was a box office failure; in 1972 it was re-released under the title Brucia amore brucia, a reference the previous Di Leo's film, Brucia, ragazzo, brucia, which had been a hit, but still failed to be profitable.

The film has been generally badly received by critics. In his analysis of the film, Paolo Mereghetti described it as an attempt to describe the social turmoil of the late 1960s, which falls into "the clichés of melodrama". According to Manlio Gomarasca, the film is a "soulless shell", formally very good, even exceeding the previous Di Leo's films, but empty in its contents. Gomarasca identifies as the main reason for the failure of the film the lack of courage in its erotic and social aspects, probably a result of the censorship issues Di Leo had suffered with his previous film Brucia, ragazzo, brucia.

References

External links
 

1969 films
1960s Italian-language films
1969 drama films
Italian drama films
1960s Italian films